The Abbey of Saint-Roman (French: Abbaye de Saint-Roman) is a cave monastery located in the communes of Beaucaire and Comps, in the Gard département of France.

The site, which includes the ruins of a castle, the château de Saint-Roman-d'Aiguille, has been protected by the French Ministry of Culture as a monument historique since 1990 and includes a chapel, cloisters, terrace, tombs and walls. It was constructed in the 9th, 10th, 12th and 15th centuries.

The abbey is reached by a signposted path from Beaucaire which leads past a vast chamber and the monks' cells to the chapel carved out of the rock which contains the tomb of St Roman. From the terrace, there is a fine view over the Rhône, Avignon and the Mont Ventoux area with Tarascon in the foreground. The Michelin Guide describes it "a site of captivating simplicity".

References

External links

 Abbey of Saint-Roman website
 

Benedictine monasteries in France
Buildings and structures in Gard
Ruins in Occitania (administrative region)
Cave monasteries
Tourist attractions in Gard
Beaucaire, Gard